The double dactyl is a verse form invented by Anthony Hecht and Paul Pascal in 1951.

Form

Like the limerick, the double dactyl has a fixed structure, is usually humorous, and is rigid in its prosodic structure. The double dactyl's prosodic requirements are more strenuous due to its increased length, and its specific requirements as to subject matter and word choice much more rigid, making it significantly more difficult to write.

There must be two stanzas, each comprising three lines of dactylic dimeter ( ¯ ˘ ˘ ¯ ˘ ˘ ) followed by a line consisting of just a choriamb ( ¯ ˘ ˘ ¯ ). The last lines of these two stanzas must rhyme. Further, the first line of the first stanza is repetitive nonsense, and the second line of the first stanza is the subject of the poem, which in the purest instances of the form is a double-dactylic proper noun. (Hecht and other poets sometimes bent or ignored this rule, as in the Robison poem below.) There is also a requirement for at least one line, preferably the second line of the second stanza, to be entirely one double dactyl word.  Some purists still follow Hecht and Pascal's original rule that no single six-syllable word, once used in a double dactyl, should ever be knowingly used again.

An example by John Hollander:

Higgledy piggledy,
Benjamin Harrison,
Twenty-third president
Was, and, as such,

Served between Clevelands and
Save for this trivial
Idiosyncrasy,
Didn't do much.

A self-referential example by Roger L. Robison:
Long-short-short, long-short-short
Dactyls in dimeter,
Verse form with choriambs
(Masculine rhyme):

One sentence (two stanzas)
Hexasyllabically
Challenges poets who
Don't have the time.

The Dutch version, called  after a children's verse, was introduced in the Dutch language by Drs. P. A similar verse form called a McWhirtle was invented in 1989 by American poet Bruce Newling.  Another related form is the double amphibrach, similar to the McWhirtle but with stricter rules more closely resembling the double dactyl.

In literature 

 The first published collection of double dactyls was Jiggery-Pokery: A Compendium of Double Dactyls, edited by Anthony Hecht and John Hollander.  Many of the poems had previously appeared in Esquire starting in 1966.
 John Bellairs' classic fantasy novel The Face in the Frost (1969) contains several double dactyls, used as nonsense magic spells.
 The first published collection of double dactyls by a single author was Centicore Poems, [Series] I; being, A Non-canonical Collection of Entirely Prejudiced Double Dactyls "perpetrated by Jay Dillon" (Ann Arbor, Michigan: Dactylomaniac Press, 1972), OCLC (Worldcat) no. 498258515. Only one copy of this book is known to survive, in the British Library (London), General Reference Collection shelfmark X.902/1639.
 Abbreviated Lays is a 2003 collection of double dactyl poetry about Roman history.

See also
Light verse
McWhirtle

References

External links 

Types of verses
Stanzaic form
Genres of poetry